Champion  is a 2003 Bengali sports-drama film directed by Rabi Kinagi. The movie features Jeet and Srabanti Chatterjee. This movie is Jeet's third movie and Srabanti Chatterjee's debut movie as a heroine. The movie is a remake of 1999 Telugu movie Thammudu which was inspired by the 1979 American movie Breaking Away.

Plot
The main theme of the film depicts how an irresponsible boy can be very responsible at a particular stage of life. In this film, we have got a glittering appearance of a new hero at Tollygunge
named 'Jeet'. Raja is a college student who is forever committing mischief. He and his peers Bhola (Bhola Tamang), Dhonu (Rudranil Ghosh) & Kanu (Shuvashish Mukherjee) always stay on the top of the list of failures. Raja has an elder brother, Rohit (Siddhartha), who is the exact opposite of the infamous Raja. Rohit works at their father's cafe and is bright in his studies. Their father is fed up with the restless Raja. Even after repeated whackings from his father, the stubborn mule refuses to change. Raja's only support is his childhood friend Kavita who is secretly in love with him. But the flirtatious Raja finds solace in the spoilt brat Riya, the daughter of a millionaire. Raja saves Riya from the villainous millionaire student Ronny. But Riya dumps Raja & patches up with the affluent Rony. In the meanwhile, Rohit starts rigorously practicing for the upcoming kickboxing championship final against Rony. All hell breaks loose when Rohit is beaten by Rony & his mates. Rohit is hospitalized in a critical condition. Raja approaches Rohit's coach and begs him to train Raja. Thus a vigorous practice schedule begins. Raja, with support from Kavita gets himself ready for the match. In the match, he emerges victorious and dedicates the trophy to Rohit and then celebrates his love with Kavita.

With Jeet's journey in the Bengali film world taking a new-found momentum from this film after the huge success of 'Saathi', the industry got yet another great young actor in Siddhartha Banerjee, in the role of Rohit (Jeet's elder brother). Siddhartha, though a regular face in TV serial lead roles, was relatively a newcomer on the big screen. His screen presence was at par with that of Jeet, and acting was top-notch. This film also gifted the industry another budding actor, Sagnik (in the role of Rony), who was a great fit opposite the Jeet-Siddhartho duo.

Cast
 Jeet as Raja
 Srabanti Chatterjee as Kavita
 Deepankar De as Raja's Father
 Rajesh Sharma as Sports Coach
 Siddhartha Banerjee as Rohit
 Subhasish Mukherjee as Kanu, Raja's friend
 Rudranil Ghosh as Dhonu
 Bhola Tamang as Bhola
 Sagnik Chatterjee as Ronny
 Sandhita Chatterjee as Riya
 Shyamal Dutta as Hemanta, Kavita's Father

Soundtrack 
Singers are Shreya Ghoshal, Kavita Krishnamurthy, Babul Supriyo, Mano, Jojo, Reema Mukherjee.

Reception
Champion was a high critically and commercially successful. Mainly Jeet's comic timing and acting were praised.

Awards

Best actor nomination (Jeet) 
Best playback singer and
Best Supporting Actor Nomination (Siddhartho Banerjee)

References

External links
 

2003 films
2000s Bengali-language films
Bengali-language Indian films
Films directed by Rabi Kinagi
Indian sports drama films
2000s sports drama films
Indian romantic drama films
Films scored by S. P. Venkatesh
Indian boxing films
2000s buddy films
2003 romantic drama films
Bengali remakes of Telugu films